Beata Kollmats (born 6 July 1992) is a Swedish footballer who plays for AS Roma in the Italian Serie A. Initially a midfielder, she later developed into a center back.

Club career

Kopparbergs/Göteborg FC
In December 2010, at the age of 18, Kollmats signed with Kopparbergs/Göteborg FC in the Damallsvenskan, the top division of women's soccer in Sweden.  She started for the club during her single season appearance during a match against Piteå IF in which Göteborg won 6–0. Göteborg won the Swedish Cup the same year.

During the 2012 season, Kollmats made 5 starts in 11 appearances for Göteborg playing a total of 496 minutes. Göteborg was runner-up for the Swedish Super Cup 2012 losing 2–1 to LdB FC Malmö. In April 2013, Göteborg defeated 2012 Damallsvenskan champions, Tyresö FF to clinch the Swedish Supercup. Kollmats returned to the Göteborg squad for the 2013 season. In August of that year, Kollmats suffered a cracked rib after colliding with goalkeeper Kristin Hammarstrom.

Kollmats was appointed Göteborg captain in April 2018, succeeding Elin Rubensson. In September 2018 Kollmats endured a difficult game against Hammarby, scoring two own-goals in Göteborg's 2–1 defeat and then being carried off with concussion.

On January 28, 2021, Kopparbergs/Göteborg FC became the women's team of BK Häcken.

AS Roma
On 15 January 2022, Kollmats joined AS Roma and signed a contract until June 2023.

Honors and awards

Team
 Winner, Svenska Cupen Women, 2011-12
 Winner, Super Cup Women, 2013

References

External links
 
 Kopparbergs/Göteborg FC player profile
 
 

Living people
1992 births
Swedish women's footballers
Women's association football midfielders
BK Häcken FF players
Damallsvenskan players
Footballers from Gothenburg